I Don't Live Here Anymore is the fifth studio album by American indie rock band The War on Drugs. It was released on October 29, 2021, through Atlantic Records. The album received widespread acclaim. "Harmonia's Dream" was nominated for Best Rock Song at the 65th Annual Grammy Awards.

Recording 
I Don't Live Here Anymore was recorded at seven different studios over the course of three years. The album was co-produced by frontman Adam Granduciel and engineer Shawn Everett. Granduciel moved to Los Angeles at the end of 2014, but spent most of 2018 living in New York City. In March 2018, while still on tour in support of the band's fourth album A Deeper Understanding, Granduciel began work on the album at Outlier Inn studio in Upstate New York. He spent a week there demoing songs with bassist Dave Hartley and multi-instrumentalist Anthony LaMarca. In between touring, Granduciel also spent time writing and recording at Studio G in Brooklyn. At the end of 2018, the band spent a week recording at Electric Lady Studios in downtown Manhattan. Granduciel spent 2019 in Los Angeles, and recorded with band at Electro-Vox Recording Studios in May 2019. Granduciel and Everett separated in March 2020 as a result of the COVID-19 pandemic. They reunited in October 2020 at Sound City Studios, where they recorded for three weeks. Recording also took place at Sunset Sound Recorders and EastWest Studios.

The songs on I Don't Live Here Anymore were all reimagined, rewritten and/or remixed multiple times over the course of the album's three-year recording process. Once the album was given a "final" mixing and was mastered by Greg Calbi, Granduciel decided to change the mixes of several songs. After a month of revision, Atlantic Records pushed back its release date. One day, Granduciel arranged a final session with Everett to complete the album. They spent twelve hours in Everett's studio remixing several tracks, and then remastered those songs themselves.

Release 
The band announced the album on July 19, 2021, simultaneously releasing the single "Living Proof". The album's title track, which features Lucius, was released on September 15, 2021. "Change" was released on October 26, 2021. I Don't Live Here Anymore was released on October 29, 2021, through Atlantic Records. It follows their Grammy Award-winning album A Deeper Understanding (2017) and is the second record of a two-album deal with Atlantic.

Critical reception 

I Don't Live Here Anymore received acclaim from music critics. At Metacritic, which assigns a normalized rating out of 100 to reviews from mainstream critics, the album received an average score of 85, based on 25 reviews, indicating "universal acclaim". Aggregator AnyDecentMusic? gave it 8.0 out of 10, based on their assessment of the critical consensus. Rhys Buchanan of NME gave the album 5 out of 5 stars, writing, "There's magic everywhere you look on this triumph of an album." Mark Beaumont of Classic Rock wrote that the album is "at its most immersive when they strip the moodscapes back to piano, glacial atmospherics and cracked emotion on "Living Proof", "Rings Around My Father's Eyes" and the rousing "Old Skin", allowing a little fragility to tint their mist blue." Writing for Beats Per Minute, John Amen concluded, "There’s something ungraspable about their music: referential yet original, derivative yet prototypical, memorable yet oddly irretrievable. Ponderous yet transcendent. A listener is invited to encounter the assorted boundaries of their own preferences, biases, identity – to let those hard lines dissolve." Sharon O'Connell of Uncut wrote, "The War On Drugs have fine-tuned their hybrid of American drivetime classicism and kosmische on "I Don't Live Here Anymore" and buffed it to a warm sheen."

Year-end lists

Track listing

Personnel 
The War on Drugs
 Adam Granduciel – vocals , acoustic guitar , lead electric guitar , piano , Juno 106 , celesta , electric guitar , synth guitar , bass , Juno 60 , Hammond organ , percussion , Wurlitzer , Kurzweil ,  Prophet-6 , MPC , 808 drum programming , Korg K2 , Walter Becker's old bass , felt piano , harmonica , ARP Quartet , Mellotron , lead guitar [outro] , production, art direction
 Dave Hartley – bass , VP-330 , Rickenbacker bass , electric guitar , OP-1 , cover and gatefold photography
 Robbie Bennett – piano , Prophet 12 , Akai AX60 , Oberheim OB-X , New Jersey electric guitar , Juno 60 , Eventide piano , ARP Solina 
 Charlie Hall – drums , percussion , prepared piano 
 Anthony LaMarca – drums , Hammond organ , percussion , electric vibes , electric guitar , pedal steel guitar , acoustic guitar 
 Jon Natchez – Prophet-6 , baritone saxophone , Hammond organ , Wurlitzer 

Additional musicians
 Michael Bloch – Mellotron , nylon AMS dub guitar , Ursa Major Telecaster , electric guitar , electric swamp guitar , lead electric guitar , lead electric raindrop guitar 
 James Elkington – lead electric guitar , lead acoustic guitar 
 Patrick Berkery – drums , percussion 
 Lee Pardini – grand piano , piano 
 Christopher Bear – drums , percussion 
 Matt Lowell – background vocals 
 Lucius – vocals 
 Eric Slick – drums , percussion 
 Sam KS – drums , percussion 
 Daniel Clarke – Hammond organ , organ 

Technical
 Shawn Everett – production, mixing, recording
 Greg Calbi – mastering
 Ivan Wayman – additional engineering
 Nick Krill – additional engineering
 Quarantine Cowboys – additional engineering
 Steve Fallone – mastering assistance

Artwork and design
 Rob Carmichael (SEEN) – art direction, design
 Dominic East – art direction
 Daniel Topete – additional studio photography
 Dustin Condren – additional studio photography

Charts

Weekly charts

Year-end charts

References 

2021 albums
The War on Drugs (band) albums
Atlantic Records albums
Albums produced by Adam Granduciel
Albums produced by Shawn Everett
Albums recorded at EastWest Studios
Albums recorded at Electric Lady Studios
Albums recorded at Electro-Vox Recording Studios
Albums recorded at Sound City Studios
Albums recorded at Sunset Sound Recorders